K-149 is a  north–south state highway in the U.S. state of Kansas. Entirely within rural Morris County, K-149's southern terminus is at U.S. Route 56 (US-56) east of Herington and the northern terminus is at K-4 south of White City. The highway passes through grasslands characteristic of the Great Plains and is a two-lane road for its entire length.

K-149 was first designated as a state highway by the State Highway Commission of Kansas, now known as the Kansas Department of Transportation, on February 13, 1957. The highway's alignment has not changed since it was created.

Route description
K-149's southern terminus is at US-56 west of Council Grove.  Aside from a  jog to the east near its midpoint due to a survey correction, the highway travels due north through the Great Plains. The roadway crosses the West Fork Neosho River and passes an abandoned schoolhouse before reaching its northern terminus at K-4 south of White City.

The Kansas Department of Transportation (KDOT) tracks the traffic levels on its highways, and in 2020, they determined that on average the traffic was 160 vehicles per day on K-149. The entire route is paved with partial design bituminous pavement.

History
K-149 was first designated a state highway by the Kansas State Highway Commission (SHC), now known as KDOT, on February 13, 1957. On June 5, 1957, the SHC asked for bids to pave the entire length of the new K-149. In November 1977, SHC approved a five-year statewide highway construction program at an estimated cost of almost $596 million (equivalent to $ in  dollars). Included in the project were plans to rebuild the K-149 bridge over the West Fork Neosho River at an estimated cost of $180,000 (equivalent to $ in  dollars). In early February 1978, it was announced that the existing  bridge will be replaced with a  concrete slab bridge. In late February 1978, the Federal Highway Administration approved the design plans for the new bridge. On August 31, 1978, the SHC asked for bids to be submitted by September 21, for the replacement bridge as well as grading and planting on a short section by the bridge. The bridge was then replaced that next year. K-149's alignment has not changed since it was created.

Major intersections

References

External links

Kansas Department of Transportation State Map
KDOT: Historic State Maps

149
Transportation in Morris County, Kansas